Chaotic was originally a Danish trading card game. It expanded to an online game in America which then became a television program based on the game. The program was able to be seen on 4Kids TV (Fox affiliates, nationwide), Jetix, The CW4Kids, Cartoon Network and Disney XD. It was brought over to the United States from Denmark by Bryan C. Gannon and Chaotic USA Entertainment Group, and produced by Chaotic USA Entertainment Group, 4Kids Productions and Bardel Entertainment. The trading card game came out 6 September 2006 in the U.S. and Canada.

Each card comes with a unique code which the owner can upload onto the Chaotic website. This allows the owner to trade and play online using their own card collection. The game was well known to be the only game with a TV show, an online game, and a TCG that were all integrated. However, the online game is currently closed.

History 

Chaotic started out as a trading card game known as "Grolls and Gorks" and an idea for a cartoon series of the same name co-authored by Merlin P. Mann, co-author of the Taynikma graphic novels, in December 2000 as 20 years, to be produced by Solit Entertainment. The name of the manuscript was changed to Chaotic in early 2001. Before any episodes were made, Dracco Company Ltd. bought the rights to Chaotic from Solit Entertainment. The original storyline featured Tom Majors and Kaz Kalinkas, who were enemies, instead of friends as in the 4Kids animated series. Dracco Company Ltd. with Apex Marketing then created the online version of the game and established the basic universe of Chaotic. In September 2003 trading card Executive Bryan C. Gannon signed a worldwide Licensing and Distribution agreement with Henrik Andersen and his brother Jacob Anderson at Dracco to bring the Chaotic game to North America and to the world. Gannon created Chaotic USA Entertainment Group and, in August 2005, licensed the patented technology, (US Patents 5,810,666 & 5,954,332) from Cornerstone Patent Technologies, LLC to bring the property up to the standards required for a global brand. He teamed with John Milito and in 2006, 4Kids Entertainment signed a Joint Marketing Agreement with Chaotic USA Entertainment (CUSA) to produce the cartoon and bring the property to market, both on TV and for licensed products. When 4Kids Entertainment teamed with CUSA, the work of CUSA was continued and included many additional improvements. The original cards were redesigned (and some renamed) along with the online game platform to give it a more mature look as well as the creation of a new animated series (with redesigned versions of Tom and Kaz) to promote the game. CUSA has been developing the online game experience for Chaotic named . A video game called Chaotic: Shadow Warriors was released on 30 December 2009.

Sam Murakami, a 4Kids employee, and Martin Rauff, the original designer with Bryan C Gannon and  TC Digital Games, adapted the card game to the U.S.

Animated series 

The TV series is based on the storyline of the original Chaotic TCG. The main protagonist is a teenager named Tom, whose friend Kaz constantly tells him of his adventures in Chaotic. Tom, who believes that Chaotic is only a card game, thinks that Kaz is making things up, until he entered a password he received from the game, transporting him to the world of Chaotic. It was then Tom knew that Kaz wasn't lying. In Chaotic, he also met some new friends, like the courageous Sarah and the comic Peyton, and new enemies, like the arrogant duo Klay and Krystella.

Players in Chaotic go to Perim, scan new creatures and use them to battle. In Perim, Tom also got to meet many creatures, including his favorite, Maxxor. The battles between players take place in dromes, which are virtual battles where players become the creatures they choose and fight for the right to battle against the drome master (code master). In Perim, the four tribes are currently at war for the Cothica, the power that controls all of Perim. In the second season, the fifth tribe, the M'arrillians, escapes from the Doors of the Deepmines and takes over the other four tribes by brainwashing other creatures. The second season featured true cel animation and manga/anime-styled artwork. Season three, although subtitled "Secrets of the Lost City," was actually a set of differently themed mini-stories, only a few episodes of which involved the so-called "Lost City".

Trading card game 

In the Chaotic Trading Card Game there are 5 different types of cards: Creatures, Battlegear, Attacks, Mugic, and Locations. Creatures are the cards players control to do battle. Battlegear is a specific item each creature is equipped with when it starts battle. Attacks are exactly that, they are used to do damage to the opponent's creatures. Mugic is a combination of music and magic, it is used by creatures who have mugic counters. Locations are the places where creatures can battle at, they are all places in Perim.

There are five tribes of creatures in Chaotic: OverWorld, UnderWorld, Danian, Mipedian and M'arrillian. The OverWorld is a tribe made of various humanoid creatures and creatures which resemble real animals. The UnderWorld is a tribe which consists of creatures which resemble various monsters. Danians are usually made to resemble ants but there are some creatures based on other insects found within the tribe. Mipedians are a tribe which is made of creatures who resemble various lizards. The M'arrillians are a tribe which resembles various deep sea creatures, some of which have a see-through appearance such as that found in a jellyfish.

The game is played by two players who control an army of creatures. The object of the game is to lower the energy of that player's opponent's creatures to 0 by way of attacks, mugic, or creature abilities. The game can be played with a varying amount of creatures in each army (1vs1, 3vs3, 6vs6, 10vs10) and with a varying amount of complexity. The game can be played in the advanced apprentice ruleset where no mugic is used and combat is only attacks. Masters is the next step up where mugic and activated abilities are used. Masters games take longer and require full knowledge of the rules.

The rules of Chaotic are basic; each player starts the game with his creatures face-down and their battlegear face-down as well. When the game begins the creatures are flipped up and the battlegear which indicates to do so is as well. There can only be two of the same card in each army, unless specified as otherwise, cards that are limited to one per army are called unique. When the game begins the starting player (which can be chosen by who is the youngest, a coin toss, etc.) starts by flipping their top location card face-up. The other player then can move a creature to an unoccupied space on the mat, or move a creature into an opponent's occupied space. Doing this will initiate combat, this is the only way to defeat a player's opponent's creatures in advanced apprentice seeing as no mugic or abilities are used. When combat begins the players see which creature has gained initiative, initiative is dependent on the location and the creatures that are battling in that location. Initiative can be anything from a stat to a certain tribe or an element. The player with the initiative gets to play the first attack.

Each player starts the game with an attack deck of 20 attacks and the game is started with 2 of these attacks in the hand, at the beginning of each player's turn during combat an attack is drawn. The attack cards each have build points which when added up equal 20. This prevents the hogging of good cards. During a player's turn they must play an attack, which sends it to the discard pile. By playing attacks the player decreases the energy of the opponent's creature. This is the key to winning the game.

References

External links 
 4Kids Homepage for the TV series
 4Kids Virtual Card Site (defunct)
 Chaotic Game Site  (closed)
 4Kids Properties – Chaotic
 Chaotic Insider
 Official Chaotic YouTube channel

 
Jetix original programming